Robert "Bobby" Haig (born 12 October 1969) is a British professional ice hockey player, and head coach. Haig has had a long career both at club and international level.

International level

Haig played for the Great Britain Junior squad from the 1986–87 season through to the 1988–89 season.

Coaching career

Haig was head coach of the Blackburn Hawks senior ice hockey team from 1998 until 2007. He was also the assistant coach to Mark Johnson who was the head coach of the Blackburn Thunderhawks, an EIHA under-19s ice hockey team which won the B-league playoffs in the 1997–98 season to gain promotion to the Northern A-league.

Medals

Haig won the Heineken League Division One title with the Fife Flyers in the 1991–92 season. He also won the Heineken League Division One Play-Offs with the same team that season.

References

1969 births
Living people
British ice hockey coaches
British ice hockey forwards
Sportspeople from Kirkcaldy